The Dagangshan Dam is an arch dam on the Dadu River in Shimian County, Ya'an, Sichuan Province, China. The dam houses a hydroelectric power station with 4 x 650 MW generators for a total installed capacity of 2,600 MW. Construction on the dam began in 2008 and the power plant in 2010. The first two generators were commissioned on 2 September 2015, and the entire project was completed in 2016.

See also 

 List of power stations in China

References

Hydroelectric power stations in Sichuan
Dams in China
Dams on the Dadu River
Arch dams
Dams completed in 2015
2015 establishments in China